Chionodes viduella is a moth of the family Gelechiidae. It is found in France, Germany, Austria, Switzerland, Italy, the Czech Republic, Slovenia, Poland, Bulgaria, Norway, Sweden, Finland, the Baltic region and Russia. It is also found in northern North America, from Alaska to Maine.

The wingspan is 13–17 mm. Adults have been recorded on wing from May to August.

The larvae feed on Rubus chamaemorus, Vaccinium uliginosum, Betula and Juniperus species.

References

Moths described in 1794
Chionodes
Moths of Europe
Moths of North America